Chambers Stevens (born June 10, 1964) is an American actor, playwright, author and acting coach. Stevens was the co-founder in 1988 of the Nashville Shakespeare Festival.

Actor 
Stevens played the title character in The Steve Spots as well as The Parent Zone.

For PBS he also played the title character in the children’s series Funnybones, as well as the spin-off series Geo-Scout, for which he received an Emmy nomination.,

Playwright 
In 1994 Chambers won the Back Stage Garland Award for his play Desperate for Magic  a one-man show in which Stevens also starred. In 2019 Chambers wrote four original plays which all premiered at the Hollywood Fringe Festival.

Plays 
 1989: Desperate for Magic
 2001: Travels with Jack Lemmon's Dog
 2005: Twain and Shaw Do Lunch
 2016 & 2019: It's Who You Know
 2019: Pho Girl
 2019: Acid Wash Love
 2019: ExtraOrdinary
 2019: Naked Man Rising

Author 
 Magnificent Monologues for Kids: Kids’ Monologues for Every Occasion Sandcastle Publishing 1999 
 24 Carat Commercials for Kids: Everything Kids Need to Know Sensational Sandcastle Publishing 1999 
 Sensational Scenes for Teens: The Scene Study-guide for Teen Actors Sandcastle Publishing 2001 
 Magnificent Monologues For Teens: The Teens’ Monologue Source For Every Occasion! Sandcastle Publishing 2002 
 Sensational Scenes for Kids: The Scene Study-Guide for Young Actors Sandcastle Publishing 2003 
 The Ultimate Commercial Book for Kids and Teens: The Young Actors’ Commercial Study-guide Sandcastle Publishing 2005 
 Magnificent Monologues for Kids 2: More Kids’ Monologues for Every Occasion Sandcastle Publishing 2009

Acting coach 

Stevens has been an audition coach for young actors since 1990. His clients have appeared on television, film and the Broadway stage.

References

External links 
 Official Website

1964 births
American male actors
Living people